Pterotopteryx vietana is a moth of the family Alucitidae. It was described by Bong-Kyu Byun and Kyu-Tek Park in 2007. It is found in Vietnam (the Vin Phu Province).

References

Moths described in 2007
Alucitidae